Roraima Airways is a regional airline of Guyana with its main hub at the Eugene F. Correira International Airport. Roraima Airways was founded in 1992.

History 

Roraima Airways was founded in 1992 to serve tourists to get them around Guyana to destinations like Kaieteur Falls, and also Mount Roraima. All flights begin or end at Georgetown's Cheddi Jagan International Airport or Eugene F. Correira International Airport. In addition to tourist flights, the airline provides charter services for passengers and cargo to practically any Aerodrome in Guyana's Interior as well as critical Medivac services both locally and internationally

Destinations 

 Brazil
 Normandia
 Boa Vista

 Guyana
 Port Kaituma
 Cheddi Jagan International
 Mabaruma
 Matthews Ridge
 Mahdia
 Eugene F. Correira International
 Lethem
 Eteringbang
 Aurora
 Baramita
 Kaieteur Falls
 Orinduik Falls
 Linden
 Trinidad and Tobago
 Piarco International Airport (3 cargo flights per week on behalf of FedEx)

Fleet 
 2 BN Islander twin engine aircraft
 3 BN Trislander triple engine aircraft

References

External links

 

Airlines of Guyana
Airlines established in 1992
1992 establishments in Guyana